Amila Sandaruwan (born 25 December 1984) is a Sri Lankan former cricketer. He played in 43 first-class and 40 List A matches between 2003/04 and 2013/14. He made his Twenty20 debut on 17 August 2004, for Sebastianites Cricket and Athletic Club in the 2004 SLC Twenty20 Tournament.

References

External links
 

1984 births
Living people
Sri Lankan cricketers
Panadura Sports Club cricketers
Ragama Cricket Club cricketers
Sebastianites Cricket and Athletic Club cricketers
Place of birth missing (living people)